Oláibar is a town and municipality located in the province and  autonomous community of Navarre, northern Spain. In 2016, it had a population of 334.

Geography
The municipality borders with Anue, Esteribar, Ezcabarte and Odieta. It is composed by 7 settlements: the villages and councils (concejos) of Endériz, Olaiz, Olave and Osacáin; and the localities (lugares) of Beraiz, Osavide and Zandio.

Demographics
Demographic evolution

References

External links

 Olaibar in the Bernardo Estornés Lasa - Auñamendi Encyclopedia (Euskomedia Fundazioa) 

Municipalities in Navarre